The Buscaylet-de Monge 7-5 was a twin engine, twin-boom aircraft without a fuselage but with pilot, passenger and fuel accommodated in a thickened wing centre-section. It was designed by Belgian pioneer Louis de Monge and built in France in the mid-1920s.

Design and development

The Buscaylet-de Monge 7-4 was built in 1923 as a one third scale flight model of the proposed de Monge 72 (or 7-2) tri-motor. The de Monge 7-5 was a development of the 1923 aircraft, retaining its configuration but with new engines and revised wings, tail, accommodation and undercarriage.

Structurally the de Monge 7-5 was an all-wood aircraft. It had no fuselage but instead a thickened section of wing between the two booms which supported the tail. The increase in span allowed the engines, new Bugatti water-cooled car-type ,  inline engines to be placed far enough apart that the propeller disks did not overlap, obviating the need for engine canting. Each engine had a rectangular radiator under it. As before the centre-section contained two side-by-side seats but their cockpits were now separate and provided with windscreens and faired headrests. As before they were positioned between the two spruce and plywood box spars, with fuel tanks on either side. Forward of the cockpit the centre-section was ply skinned, with fabric covering elsewhere.

The much thinner section cantilever outer wing panels beyond the booms had the strong straight taper of its predecessor but with elliptical, instead of straight, clipped, tips.  They carried long but not full-span ailerons. Like the centre-section the outer wings were built on pairs of spars.

The 7-5's twin booms were attached to brackets on the rear corners of the centre-section; the booms were longer than on the 7-4, placing the elevator hinge about  further behind the centre-section trailing edge. Curved, balanced control surfaces replaced the earlier unbalanced ones.  Its elevator was elliptical in plan with the straight-edged tailplane projecting forward.

A faired vertical leg with a steel tube core from near the edge supported the outer axle end on a rubber shock absorber. Four cables supplied fore-and-aft rigidity.

The de Monge 7-5 was exhibited at the 1924 9th Paris Salon as an experimental type. The exact date of its first flight is not known but flight trials were ongoing in July 1925. It was "readily convertible" into an ambulance aircraft with room for one wounded man and a nurse, or for two wounded. It is not known if these engines were ever fitted nor if any examples beyond the prototype were completed.

Even though its primary purpose was to assist the design of the de Monge 72, because of its low power and aerodynamic cleanliness the de Monge 7-5 was, like the de Monge 7-4 before it, seen as a contender in fuel economy based competitions and for endurance and distance flight records. In May 1926 Captain Cousin was preparing for an endurance record attempt, flying continuously between Paris and Rouen. In July 1926 the 7-5, sponsored by its propeller maker Lumière, was one of seventeen aircraft from six countries entered in the Concours d'Avions Economique, held in August. The absence of further reports suggests none of these projects led to success.

Specifications

References

Twin-boom aircraft
1920s French experimental aircraft
Aircraft first flown in 1925
Twin-engined tractor aircraft